The John O'Gaunt was an English automobile manufactured in Lancaster from 1901 until 1904. Built by William Atkinson & Sons, the 4 hp vehicle was "made to meet the requirements of people who do not require a high-priced car".

See also 
 List of car manufacturers of the United Kingdom

References

Defunct motor vehicle manufacturers of England
Companies based in Lancaster, Lancashire